Rouzet is a French surname. Notable people with the surname include:

 Jacques Rouzet, French scriptwriter and writer
 Jacques-Marie Rouzet (1743–1820), comte de Folmon, French politician
 Lucien Rouzet (1886–1948), French physicist and inventor

French-language surnames